Pluteus velutinus is a species of agaric fungus in the family Pluteaceae. Described as new to science in 2012, it is found in India.

See also

List of Pluteus species

References

External links

velutinus
Fungi described in 2012
Fungi of Asia